The University of Music and Performing Arts Munich, also known as the Munich Conservatory, is a performing arts conservatory in Munich, Germany. The main building it currently occupies is the former Führerbau of the NSDAP, located at Arcisstraße 12, on the eastern side of the Königsplatz. Teaching and other events also take place at Luisenstraße 37a, Gasteig, the Prinzregententheater (theatre studies), and in Wilhelmstraße (ballet). Since 2008, the Richard Strauss Conservatory (de), until then independent, has formed part of the university.

History
In 1846, a private institution called the Royal Conservatory of Music (Königliches Conservatorium für Musik) was founded, and in 1867, at the suggestion of Richard Wagner, this was transformed by King Ludwig II into the Royal Bavarian Music School (Königliche bayerische Musikschule), financed privately by Ludwig II until gaining the status of a state institution in 1874. It has since been renamed several times: to the Royal Academy of the Art of Music (Königliche Akademie der Tonkunst), the State Academy of Music (Staatliche Akademie der Tonkunst), the University for Music (Hochschule für Musik) and finally to the present name in 1998.

Its original location, the Odeonsgebäude, was destroyed in 1944. The current building was constructed for the Nazi party by Paul Troost and was called the Führerbau. Neville Chamberlain and Adolf Hitler signed the Munich Agreement in this building in 1938.  Hitler's office, on the second floor above the main entrance, is now a rehearsal room, but has been changed little since it was built.

In 1974, the Bavarian University Act placed the Munich college, as well as all other Bavarian music colleges, on an educational par with art colleges.

Programmes
The University of Music and Performing Arts Munich offers study programmes in performing and teaching in all music subjects and ballet, as well as joint study programmes with the Bayerische Theaterakademie August Everding covering operatic performance, acting, directing, musicals, make-up for the theatre and lighting design.

Former and present staff 

Josef Rheinberger
Max Reger composition from 1905 to 1906
Fritz Lehmann 1953–1956
Fritz Schieri chorus line, composition and music theory from 1959 to 1990
Ernst Haefliger 1971–1988 voice
Wilhelm Killmayer 1973–1992 composition
Diethard Hellmann 1974 choral conducting, 1981–1988 director
Max Beckschäfer 1988–2001 composition theory
Margarita Höhenrieder piano since 1991
Rudi Spring since 1999 Lied interpretation
Miku Nishimoto-Neubert, piano accompaniment since 2002
Siegfried Mauser, Rektor 2003–2007; 2007–2014
Talia Or (born 1977), singing
Christoph Poppen since 2003 violin and chamber music
Bernd Redmann since 2005 music theory and ear training
Jan Müller-Wieland since 2007 composition
Julia Fischer since 2011 violin
Bernhard Haas since 2013 organ
Marcus Bosch (from 2016), conducting

Alumni 

Laura Aikin
Benjamin Appl
Valentina Babor
Jason Barry-Smith
Nélida Béjar
Martin Bernheimer
Winfried Bönig
Milana Chernyavska
Annette Dasch
Gabriel Dessauer
Jurgita Dronina
Christoph von Dohnányi
Claudia Eder
Rafael Frühbeck de Burgos
Mihoko Fujimura
Ricardo Gallen
Christian Gerhaher
Thomas Guggeis
Claus Guth
Hildegard Heichele
Gerold Huber
Nicolaus A. Huber
Anna Korsun
Horst Laubenthal
Elisabeth Lindermeier 
Nick McCarthy
Gerhard Merkl
Nils Mönkemeyer
Carl Orff
Helga Pogatschar
Bernd Purkrabek
Bernd Redmann
Pichu Sambamoorthi
Hanns-Martin Schneidt
Kirill Troussov
Jörg Widmann
Heinz Winbeck
Carl Valentin Wunderle
Karl Maria Zwißler
Jonas Kaufmann

Honorary doctorates
 Hans Werner Henze 2004
 
 Gernot Gruber 2011

See also
 Nazi architecture
Music schools in Germany

References

External links

 
Official website: courses 
University of Music and Performing Arts Munich at study-in-Bavaria.de
University of Music &Performing Arts Munich at muenchen.de
University of Music and Performing Arts Munich at Facebook.com
THE UNIVERSITY OF MUSIC AND PERFORMING ARTS MUNICH at wdc-award.org
Academy of Music and Performing Arts Munich at 4icu.org
University of Music and Performing Arts Munich at university-directory.eu
Bayerische Theaterakademie August Everding
Effects of the Bologna Declaration on Professional Music Training in Europe
European Association of Conservatoires (AEC)

 
Educational institutions established in 1846
Music schools in Germany
Universities and colleges in Munich
Nazi architecture
Maxvorstadt
1846 establishments in Bavaria
Arts organizations established in the 1840s